Leila Consuelo Martínez Ortega (born 27 April 1994) is a Cuban volleyball player.

Martínez was selected to play at the 2020 Olympic Games in Tokyo alongside Lidiannis Echevarria. The duo won two rounds 2–0.

References

External links
 
 
 
 

Living people
1994 births
Cuban beach volleyball players
Women's beach volleyball players
Olympic beach volleyball players of Cuba
Beach volleyball players at the 2020 Summer Olympics
Sportspeople from Havana
Pan American Games silver medalists for Cuba
Pan American Games medalists in volleyball
Medalists at the 2015 Pan American Games
Beach volleyball players at the 2015 Pan American Games